Gomotage (ɣɔ21 mɔ33 ta55 ɣə21; also known as ɣɔ31 mɔ33 zɔ31 in Duan (1998)) is a Loloish language of Eryuan County, Yunnan. Gomotage is probably closely related to Kua-nsi, spoken in Heqing County (Yang 2010:7).

Distribution
Duan (1998:147) lists the following locations.

Eryuan County 洱源县
Dasongdian 大松甸, Cibi Township 茨碧乡
Dananping 南大坪, Sanying Township 三营乡
Sanmei Village 三枚村, Yousuo Township 右所乡
Heqing County 鹤庆县
Anle 安乐 and Xinfeng 新丰, Chengjiao Township 城郊乡
Dafudi 大福地, Xingtun Township 辛屯乡
Xiyuan Village 西圆村, Beiya Township 北衙乡

References

Loloish languages